The Ailette is a  long river in the Aisne department in eastern France. Its source is at Sainte-Croix. It flows generally west-northwest.

On most of its course, it shares its valley with the Canal de l'Oise à l'Aisne.

Communes along its course
This list is ordered from source to mouth: 
Aisne: Sainte-Croix, Corbeny, Craonne, Bouconville-Vauclair, Chermizy-Ailles, Neuville-sur-Ailette, Cerny-en-Laonnois, Chamouille, Pancy-Courtecon, Colligis-Crandelain, Trucy, Chevregny, Monampteuil, Filain, Pargny-Filain, Urcel, Chavignon, Royaucourt-et-Chailvet, Chaillevois, Merlieux-et-Fouquerolles, Vaudesson, Pinon, Lizy, Anizy-le-Château, Vauxaillon, Landricourt, Leuilly-sous-Coucy, Jumencourt, Crécy-au-Mont, Coucy-le-Château-Auffrique, Pont-Saint-Mard, Guny, Champs, Trosly-Loire, Saint-Paul-aux-Bois, Pierremande, Bichancourt, Manicamp, Quierzy

References

Rivers of France
Rivers of Hauts-de-France
Rivers of Aisne